Gameplayers is a novel by Stephen Bowkett published in 1986.

Plot summary
Gameplayers is a novel in which a youth escapes into role-playing games from his difficult home life.

Reception
Dave Langford reviewed Gameplayers for White Dwarf #85, and stated that "It's all rather well done, though there's a faintly moralizing note of Fantasy Games May Damage Your Mental Health..."

Reviews
Review by Andy Sawyer (1989) in Paperback Inferno, #76

References

1986 novels